Fu Zhongwei (born October 1963) is a former Chinese politician who spent his entire career in northeast China's Liaoning province. As of November 2022, he was under investigation by China's top anti-corruption agency. He is the second ministerial-level official to be targeted by anti-corruption authorities since the 20th National Congress of the Chinese Communist Party in October 2022. Previously he served as chairman of Shenyang Municipal People's Congress and before that, party secretary of Panjin.

He was a representative of the 19th National Congress of the Chinese Communist Party

Early life and education
Fu was born in Haicheng County (now Haicheng), Liaoning, in October 1963. In 1982, he enrolled at Harbin Institute of Technology, where he majored in management engineering. After graduating in 1986, he taught at North China Institute of Aerospace Engineering. He also received a MBA from Dalian University of Technology in 1997 and a master's degree in public administration from National University of Singapore in 2006.

Political career
Fu joined the Chinese Communist Party (CCP) in July 1984.

Fu got involved in politics in 1988, when he was an official in the Industrial Traffic Audit Division of Dalian Municipal Audit Bureau, where he eventually becoming its director in 1995. In 1998, he was appointed assistant director of Liaoning Provincial Audit Office, becoming deputy director in 2001 and director in 2015. In 2018, he was named party secretary of Panjin, his first foray into a prefectural leadership role. In 2020, he was named chairman of Shenyang Municipal People's Congress, confirmed in 2021.

Investigation
On 9 September 2022, Fu has been placed under investigation for "serious violations of laws and regulations" by the Central Commission for Discipline Inspection (CCDI), the party's internal disciplinary body, and the National Supervisory Commission, the highest anti-corruption agency of China.

References

1963 births
Living people
People from Haicheng, Liaoning
Harbin Institute of Technology alumni
Dalian University of Technology alumni
National University of Singapore alumni
People's Republic of China politicians from Liaoning
Chinese Communist Party politicians from Liaoning